The Sisters of St. John the Baptist (Baptistines) are a Roman Catholic female religious institute, founded in Angri in 1879, by Alfonso Maria Fusco.

History

Shortly before he was ordained in 1863, Alfonso Maria Fusco dreamt that he was called to found an orphanage and a new religious community of women to staff it. He was assigned to Angri where the parish church was dedicated to Saint John the Baptist. There he met Maddalena Caputo, who was interested in entering religious life. In September 1878, Caputo and three others became the first Sisters of St. John the Baptist of the Nazarene. They converted a dilapidated house into the Little House of Providence to shelter orphans. They were given an education, and the older ones taught a trade. Caputo, now known as  Sister Crocifissa, became the first superior of the institute.

Expansion
Growing requests for assistance led to the establishment of other houses in Campania and elsewhere throughout Italy. 

The sisters came to Canada in 1962. They operate Infant Jesus Daycare centers in Hamilton and Waterdown.
The congregation sent its first members to India, where they arrived at Madurai -Tamil, Nadu in 1977. The provincial house is in Bangalore. The sisters in Zambia operate a number of schools.

Present day
The Sisters serve in about seventeen countries on five continents. The generalate of the Congregation is located in Rome, Italy. As of 2021, there were 700 members of the congregation.

References

External links
 (American Province)
 Website of the Italian province

Catholic female orders and societies
Catholic religious institutes established in the 19th century